Sylvia Regina Rexach González (January 22, 1922 – October 20, 1961), was a Puerto Rican comedy scriptwriter, poet, singer and composer of boleros.

Early years
Rexach was born and raised in Santurce, Puerto Rico. Her parents were Julio E. Rexach of Fajardo, and María Teresa González, of San Juan, Puerto Rico. There she attended public school and received her primary education. She then went to a private school where she finished her secondary education before attending the Central High School of Santurce. During her high school years, when she was 14 years old, she wrote several poems which were to become part of her musical compositions.  She amazed her teachers when she composed "Di, Corazón" (Tell me, Heart) and "Matiz de Amor" (Calm Love).  Rexach also learned how to play musical instruments, such as the guitar, the piano and the saxophone at a young age.

World War II
Rexach enrolled in the University of Puerto Rico where she was going to take a pre-legal course; however, when the United States entered World War II in 1942, Rexach dropped-out of the university and joined the United States Army as a member of the WACS (Women Army Corps Service), where she served as an office clerk.

Post World War II
After the war, Rexach was discharged from the armed forces. She married army officer William J. Riley with whom she had three children which included actress/singer Sharon Riley. The marriage eventually ended in a divorce and she returned to Puerto Rico, where she went to work for a radio station as a comical script writer, first for producer Tommy Muñiz, and later for comedian Ramón Rivero "Diplo".  She was the founder of the first Combo in Puerto Rico consisting entirely of women.  They were named Las Damiselas (The Damsels), and besides Rexach included: Idalia Rosario, Marta Romero, Millita Quiñones, Elena Rita Ortiz, and Ketty Cabán.

Singing career
In 1951, Rexach had a newspaper column called "A Sotto Voce" where she was a music critic. She was also a co-founder of The Puerto Rican Society of Authors, Composers and Music Editors (Sociedad Puertorriqueña de Autores, Compositores y Editores de Música).  She was its Secretary Director, a position which held until the day of her death.

The tones of Rexach's compositions varied from the soft and romantic to the harsh and tormented.  Among her compositions that became hits in Puerto Rico and abroad were: "Alma Adentro" (Inner Soul, actually a homage to a brother who died in an accident), "Idilio", "Olas y Arenas" (Waves and Sands), "Mi Versión" (My Version), "Nave sin Rumbo" (Wandering Ship), "Di, Corazón" and "Matiz de Amor". She even wrote a humorous novelty song, "Cuchú cuchía", which features Rafael Hernández Marín as a co-composer.

Sylvia Rexach, was an alcoholic at the time of her death October 20, 1961, in San Juan, Puerto Rico. Her death certificate states the cause as an intestinal obstruction, complicated by a duodenal atresia. She was buried at Cementerio Buxeda in Carolina, Puerto Rico

Legacy
Her compositions have been recorded by many other artists, such as Marco Antonio Muñiz, Danny Rivera, Gilberto Monroig, Chucho Avellanet, Lucecita Benítez, Juan Luis Barry, Linda Ronstadt, Ednita Nazario, Lourdes Pérez and Lunna.  Two television specials were made about Sylvia's life, "Sylvia, en tu Memoria" (Sylvia, in your Memory) and Ángela Meyer's "El fondo del Dolor" (In the Deepest Pain) starring Sharon Riley, Sylvia's daughter.

In 2001, Rexach was posthumously inducted into the International Latin Music Hall of Fame. There is a theater "El Teatro Sylvia Rexach" named after Rexach in San Juan  and in the Luis A. Ferre Center of Fine Arts, there is a Sylvia Rexach Cafe Theater.

On May 29, 2014, the Legislative Assembly of Puerto Rico honored 12 illustrious women who by virtue of their merits and legacies stand out in the history of Puerto Rico with plaques in the "Plaza en Honor a la Mujer Puertorriqueña" (Plaza Honoring Puerto Rican Women) in San Juan. Rexach was among those honored.

See also

List of Puerto Ricans
Puerto Rican Songwriters
List of female composers
List of composers by nationality
History of women in Puerto Rico

References

1922 births
1961 deaths
People from San Juan, Puerto Rico
Puerto Rican Army personnel
Puerto Rican women composers
20th-century Puerto Rican women singers
Puerto Rican poets
Puerto Rican singer-songwriters
Puerto Rican women in the military
United States Army soldiers
Women's Army Corps soldiers
Women in the United States Army
Women in World War II
Women in Latin music